The family as a model for the organization of the state is a theory of political philosophy.

Confucian thought

The concept of family is important in classical Confucianism. For Confucius, xiào or filial piety was a dé or virtue. The character representing xiào, 孝, itself represents a basic family structure, with the upper component representing elders (lao, old), and the lower representing children (zi, son). Those acting with filial piety, such as through the performances of lĭ were therefore acting in accordance with yì (righteousness, or fulfilling one's proper roles or acting in harmony with one's station). The relationship of this concept to the state is discussed at length in the Xiàojīng, or Classic of Filial Piety. In politics, xiào is not simply loyalty on the part of subordinates and citizens, but also an expectation for the king to provide for his subjects with "paternal love"; just as the people were expected to act with respect for the king's law, the king was expected to make those laws out of kindness for the people.

The American diplomat Edmund Roberts in his description of Canton City, which he visited in 1832, included a quote on this for which he gives no source:
The sovereign of men, say they, "is heaven's son; nobles and statesmen are the sovereign's children; the people are the children of nobles and statesmen. The sovereign should serve heaven as a father, never forgetting to cherish reverential thoughts, but exciting himself to illustrate his virtues, and looking up to receive from heaven, the vast patrimony which it confers; thus the emperors will daily increase in felicity and glory. Nobles and ministers of state should serve their sovereign as a father, never forgetting to cherish reverential thoughts, not harbouring covetous and sordid desires, nor engaging in wicked and clandestine thoughts, but faithfully and justly exerting themselves; thus their noble rank will be preserved. The people should never forget to cherish reverential thoughts towards the nobles and ministers of state, to obey and keep the laws; to excite no secret or open rebellion; then no great calamity will befall their persons."

Politics and the family
In her book, Delacroix, Art and Patrimony in Post-Revolutionary France, Elisabeth Fraser analyses Eugène Delacroix's famous “Massacres of Chios” (1824), which helped galvanise Hellenism in France. Delacroix's symbol for the oppressed Greek nation was a family employed as a conceptual and visual structuring device. A reviewer encapsulated Fraser's argument:

Equating patriarchal family metaphor with government paternalism and imperialist protectionism, the chapter argues that such familial intimations, heightened by acute emotionalism and hints of a Western culture soiled by Eastern penetration, corresponded to and reflected a paternalistic government urge to protect the victimized Greeks, a thinly veiled justification for French colonial intervention in the Mediterranean.

See also
 Paternalism
 Pater patriae
 Patrimonialism
 Fatherland
 Robert Filmer
 Confucianism

Notes

References
 Elisabeth Fraser Delacroix, Art and Patrimony in Post-Revolutionary France (2004, Cambridge: Cambridge University Press)

Political philosophy
Family
Corporatism
Confucianism